The 1896 United States presidential election in New York took place on November 3, 1896. All contemporary 45 states were part of the 1896 United States presidential election. Voters chose 36 electors to the Electoral College, which selected the president and vice president.

New York was won by the Republican nominees, former Governor William McKinley of Ohio and his running mate corporate lawyer Garret Hobart of New Jersey. McKinley and Hobart defeated the Democratic nominees, former Congressman William Jennings Bryan of Nebraska and his running mate industrialist Arthur Sewall of Maine. Bryan also ran and received votes on the Populist Party line, with running mate Congressman Thomas E. Watson of Georgia.

Also in the running was the National Democratic Party (Gold Democrat) candidate, John M. Palmer of Illinois, who ran with former Governor of Kentucky Simon Bolivar Buckner on a platform advocating for the gold standard.

McKinley carried New York State with 57.58% of the vote to Bryan’s 38.72%, a victory margin of 18.85%. Palmer came in a distant third, with 1.33%.

New York weighed in for this election as about fourteen percent more Republican than the national average.

Bryan, running on a platform of free silver, appealed strongly to Western miners and farmers in the 1896 election, but had little appeal in Northeastern states like New York. Consequently, he performed especially weakly for a Democrat in New York, losing every county in the state except for Schoharie County upstate. This included New York City, where McKinley outpolled Bryan by about 60,000 votes. McKinley would lose New York City to Bryan in their 1900 rematch four years later and Bryan would later win the city again against William Howard Taft in 1908. New York City would not vote Republican again until Warren Harding won it in 1920.

This election would begin the Fourth Party System, which would last from 1896 to 1928 and where New York would become a reliably Republican state in nearly all of the presidential elections during that era barring 1912.

Results

Results by county

See also
 United States presidential elections in New York
 Presidency of William McKinley

Notes

References

New York
1896
1896 New York (state) elections